Pablo Fernández Antuña (born 13 March 1979), commonly known as Blin, is a Spanish retired footballer who played as a right back.

Club career
Blin was born in La Felguera, Langreo, Asturias, and was a Sporting de Gijón youth graduate. He made his senior debut with the reserves during the 1997–98 season, and went on to play several seasons in Segunda División B.

Blin made his debut with the main squad on 26 November 2000, starting in a 0–1 Segunda División home loss against Recreativo de Huelva. He became a regular first-team starter afterwards, contributing with 22 appearances as his side finished seventh.

Blin subsequently struggled severely with injuries, featuring in only one further match after his first injury. He also spent the 2003–04 campaign on loan at third division side Real Avilés.

In March 2006, Blin was officially dismissed by the club.

References

External links

1979 births
Living people
Spanish footballers
Footballers from Asturias
Association football defenders
Segunda División players
Segunda División B players
Sporting de Gijón B players
Sporting de Gijón players
Real Avilés CF footballers